The Battle of Segheneyti, or Saganèiti, was a small clash fought on August 8 1888 between the troops of the Kingdom of Italy and Abyssinian irregulars towards the end of the Italo-Ethiopian War of 1887-1889.

Battle
In July 1889 the troops of General Antonio Baldissera began operations to extend Italian possessions in Eritrea, starting from the already acquired Massawa they targeted the plateau cities of Keren and Asmara. During this phase the Italians faced the problem of a local leader, Debeb, who close to Ras Alula and previously in their service. Debeb and his irregulars had deserted in March 1888, after the troops of General San Marzano had led raids against the tribes which submitted to the Italians.

The task of capturing Debeb and dispersing his band was entrusted by Baldissera to captain Cornacchia, who headed a contingent of 400 "bashi-bazouk", 300 local irregulars and four Italian officers. The contingent departed from Ua-a on 4 August 1889, to the village of Segeneiti, where, according to the spies, Debeb's camp was located.

On August 8, 1889 the Italian contingent occupied Segheneyti, but Debeb was not found there, having been warned in time, and had fled the village to stand with his troops on the nearby heights. From there Debeb's superior forces ambushed the Cornish column; After killing the captain and other Italian officers, the contingent disbanded and retreated to Massawa, leaving about 200 casualties on the field.

The defeat, though minor, drew heavy criticism towards Baldissera; In response, the general offered his resignation, which was rejected by the prime minister Francesco Crispi, who reaffirmed his confidence in the general's work. "The first group of askari was formed in October 1888, after the débacle of the basci-buzuk at Saganeiti, seen almost as a second Dogali, where all the Italian officers died while the 800 irregulars fled, followed by Debeb's men who killed around three hundred of them."

Fallen Italian officers at Segheneyti 
 Captain Tullio Cornacchia
 Lieutenant Marcello Brero
 Lieutenant Umberto Poli
 Lieutenant Giulio Viganò
 Lieutenant Virginio Virgini

All five officers were decorated with the Silver Medal of Military Valor

See also 
 Battle of Dogali
 First Italo-Ethiopian War

References 

Conflicts in 1888
1888 in Ethiopia
1888 in Italy
Segheneyti
Battles involving Italy
Ethiopia–Italy military relations